Krivitsy is a rural locality (a village) in Kovarditskoye Rural Settlement, Muromsky District, Vladimir Oblast, Russia. The population was 152 as of 2010.

Geography 
Krivitsy is located on the Zhernovka River, 15 km southwest of Murom (the district's administrative centre) by road. Staroye Ratovo is the nearest rural locality.

References 

Rural localities in Muromsky District
Muromsky Uyezd